Cómbita is a town and municipality in the Colombian Department of Boyacá, part of the sub region of the Central Boyacá Province.

History 
Cómbita was in the time before the arrival of the Spanish conquistadores inhabited by the Muisca, organized in their loose Muisca Confederation. The ruler of the northern Muisca was the zaque of Hunza, modern day Tunja. The cacique of Cómbita was loyal to the zaque.

In the Chibcha language of the Muisca, Cómbita means either "Hand of the jaguar and wheel of life" or "Force of the summit".

Modern Cómbita was founded in 1586.

Economy 
The economical activities of Cómbita are agriculture; potatoes, barley, wheat, maize and peas, and livestock farming.

Born in Cómbita 
 Pedro Medina Avendaño, Colombian lawyer and poet
 Nairo Quintana, professional cyclist, Giro d'Italia general classification winner, Vuelta a España general classification winner, 2nd place in the Tour de France of 2013 and 2015
 Dayer Quintana, professional cyclist, brother of Nairo
 Ismael Sarmiento, former professional cyclist

Gallery

References 

Municipalities of Boyacá Department
Populated places established in 1586
1586 establishments in the Spanish Empire
Muisca Confederation
Muysccubun